Großer Preis der Deutschen Akademie für Kinder- und Jugendliteratur e.V. Volkach is a Bavarian literary prize.

Winners 

 1976: Walter Scherf
 1977: Barbara Mandler-Bondy, Sybil Gräfin Schönfeldt
 1978: Willi Fährmann, Hans-Georg Noack
 1979: Anna Krüger, Max Lüthi
 1980: Michael Ende
 1981: Richard Bamberger, Cesar Bresgen
 1982: Barbara Bartos-Höppner
 1983: Kurt Lütgen
 1984: Herbert Holzing
 1985: Ludwig Denecke, Heinz Rölleke
 1986: Internationale Jugendbibliothek of Munich
 1987: Paul Maar
 1988: Otfried Preußler
 1989: Heinz Wegehaupt
 1990: Sigrid Heuck
 1991: Helme Heine
 1992: Josef Guggenmos
 1993: Hans-Peter Thiel
 1994: Arnulf Zitelmann
 1995: Käthe Recheis
 1996: James Krüss
 1997: Margret and Rolf Rettich
 1998: Walter Kahn
 1999: Klaus Kordon
 2000: Max Kruse
 2001: Mirjam Pressler
 2002: Rudolf Herfurtner
 2003: Renate Welsh
 2004: Binette Schröder
 2005: Max Bolliger
 2006: Chen Jun
 2007: Nikolaus Heidelbach
 2008: Kirsten Boie
 2009: Gudrun Pausewang
 2010: Klaus Ensikat
 2011: Peter Härtling

Literary awards of Bavaria